This is a list of Mexican television related events from 2002.

Events
3 March - The television reality show Big Brother México debuts on Televisa.
16 June - The first season of Big Brother México is won by Rocío Cárdenas.
28 July - Galilea Montijo is voted winner of the first season of Big Brother VIP.
10 November - Darina Márquez wins the first season of Operación Triunfo.

Debuts
3 March - Big Brother México (2002-2005, 2015–present)

Television shows

1970s
Plaza Sésamo (1972–present)

Deaths

See also
List of Mexican films of 2002
2002 in Mexico